Wuhuang is a town in the Yanjiang District of Ziyang, Sichuan, China. The town's administrative division code is 512002110000.

Administrative divisions 
Wuhuang is divided into 1 residential community and 16 administrative villages.

Residential community 
Wuhuangchang Community serves as the town's sole residential community.

Villages 
The town has the following 16 administrative villages:

 Hongmiao Village
 Guojia Village
 Yinhe Village
 Shiqiao Village
 Yiwanshui Village
 Wuli Village
 Jiangxi Village
 Chongxing Village
 Puzi Village
 Baipo Village
 Maliu Village
 Baohua Village
 Honghua Village
Piaoshan Village
 Yuanyi Village
 Gaomiao Village

Former divisions 
Former administrative divisions of Wuhuang include Wutai Village, Wadian Village, Longmen Village, Qiangong Village, Nantan Village, Shuangfeng Village, Huaxiang Village, Yanjing Village, and Paotai Village.

Demographics 
As of 2018, Wuhuang has a hukou population of 55,180. In the 2010 Chinese Census, Wuhuang had a recorded population of 40,004.

Economy 
Baipo Village in Wuhuang is home to 120 mu of cherry orchards, producing a specific type of cherries known as hongfei cherries.

References 

Township-level divisions of Sichuan
Ziyang